The New Boss Guitar of George Benson is the debut studio album by American jazz/soul guitarist George Benson released on 1964 under Prestige Records.

Track listing (for Prestige PR 7310)

Personnel
George Benson – guitar
The Brother Jack McDuff Quartet
Brother Jack McDuff – piano, organ
Red Holloway – tenor saxophone
Ronnie Boykins – bass (tracks 1-7)
Montego Joe – drums (tracks 1-7)
Joe Dukes – drums (track 8)

References

George Benson albums
1964 debut albums
Prestige Records albums